Hibbertia miniata, commonly known as orange flower,
is a small shrub in the family Dilleniaceae and is endemic  to Western Australia.

Description
The leaf edges rolled under, becoming more pronounced as they dry. The mid-rib on the underside prominent. The dry flower bracts are broad, brown, egg-shaped to lance egg-shaped, concave, smooth and acute at the apex. The peduncles are smooth with very short silky hairs. The flowers are borne singly or in small groups at the end of the branches on a short stalk. Flowering occurs from August to November.

Taxonomy and naming
Hibbertia miniata was first formally described in 1936 by Charles Austin Gardner and the description was published in Journal of the Royal Society of Western Australia. The species name (miniata) is a Latin word meaning "flame-scarlet".

Distribution and habitat
Orange flower hibbertia has a restricted distribution, grows in gravelly lateritic soils in Chittering, Gingin, Moora, Toodyay and Victoria Plains.

References

miniata
Eudicots of Western Australia
Taxa named by Charles Gardner